Pettysville is an unincorporated community in Richland Township, Miami County, in the U.S. state of Indiana.

History
Pettysville was named for storekeeper Daniel Petty, who platted the community in 1872 when the Vandalia Railroad was extended to that point. A post office was established at Pettysville in 1875, and remained in operation until it was discontinued in 1917.

Geography
Pettysville is on the Eel River, in the eastern part of Richland Township.

References

Unincorporated communities in Miami County, Indiana
Unincorporated communities in Indiana